Rotten Sound is a Finnish grindcore band from Vaasa, formed in 1993. The band comprises vocalist Keijo Niinimaa, guitarist Mika Aalto, bassist Kristian Toivainen, and drummer Sami Latva. The band has released eight studio albums and "earned a reputation for being one of the most intense bands on the Scandinavian death metal/grindcore scene".

History

Formation, Under Pressure and Drain (1993–2000) 

Rotten Sound was founded by guitarist Mika Aalto in Vaasa, Finland, in 1993. The group started recordings in 1994, releasing the single Sick Bastard through Genet label. Their subsequent underground releases, between singles and EPs, included 1995's Psychotic Veterinarian on SOA, 1996's Loosin' Face on Anomie, and 1997's Splitted Alive on IDS.

Rotten Sound's first full-length album, Under Pressure, was released by Repulse Records (a Spanish label) in 1998 and was followed by Drain (also on Repulse) in 1999. This album was also the debut of second guitarist Juha Ylikoski. In early 2000, the band signed with American Necropolis Records, a subsidiary Deathvomit label for release the EP Still Psycho, which included a cover of Carcass's "Reek of Putrefaction". Paul Kott of Allmusic praised the album saying, "Rotten Sound does a good job, and although the audio production does leave something to be desired, the finished product is well worth listening to for any fan of earlier death metal and more recent grindcore. The video segments are very well-produced, with fantastic live audio recording, multiple camera angles, and good edits." The band toured in Europe to promote the album, along with label mates Hateplow, In Aeturnum and Malevolent Creation.

Murderworks and Exit (2001–2005) 

Rotten Sound release their second full-length, Murderworks, in 2002. The Allmusic reviewer Alex Henderson stated, "This 2002 release gives the listener no room to breathe; from start to finish, Murderworks is an exercise in sensory assault for the sake of sensory assault." For the album's promotion, the group headline a European tour, titled Murdering Europe, with support of two Czech bands, Fleshless and Lykathea Aflame. They also toured Europe during June 2003, along with Hateplow and Debauchery. In May 2004, Rotten Sound teamed up with Circle of Dead Children, Phobia, and Strong Intention for US Grind the East Coast tour. The band's fourth studio album, Exit, was recorded at Soundlab studio in Örebro, Sweden with engineer Mieszko Talarczyk and mastered at the Cutting Room. Shortly after their release, the album peaked at number 22 on the Finnish album charts. In March 2005, the band teamed up with Disfear for a co-headline Scandinavian tour.

Consume to Contaminate and Cycles (2006-2007)
In January 2006, the band has embarked to European Tour dubbed the "Grind Your Face Off Tour 2006" in support of reissued Murderworks released on 6 January 2006 The "Grind Your Face Off Tour" extends for four weeks across European along with Sayyadina. They released  an eight-song mini-CD Consume to Contaminate on 7 June 2006 via Spinefarm Records. Rotten Sound supported Malevolent Creation on their European Tour in early 2007.

In July 2007, they entered the studio to begin recording their fifth studio album Cycles which was released on 9 January 2008 via Spinefarm Records. The album was recorded and mixed with Janne Saksa at Kantola and Sound Supreme studios. Mastering was handled by Pelle Henricsson at Tonteknik Studios. The first song "The Effects" was posted on their Myspace page.

Napalm and Cursed (2009-2011)

In November 2009, the band signed a new record deal with Relapse Records to release their follow-up studio album of Cycles. Keijo Niinimaa commented:

Rotten Sound released the Napalm EP on 30 March 2010 via Relapse Records. It features three new tracks in addition to three Napalm Death covers. Rotten Sound also joined with Aborted and The Red Chord for the "Machines of Grind" tour, a three-week co-headlining European tour. The tour kicked off in mid-April, and included stops at the Neurotic Death Fest and Revolution Fest Open Air. The three bands also co-headlined on several dates throughout the United Kingdom for "Terrorizer Tour-ture", a tour sponsored by Terrorizer Magazine.

In December 2010, Rotten Sound announced that their sixth studio album, entitled Cursed, would be released on 15 March 2011 via Relapse Records (except in Finland, where it arrived on 16 March 2011 through Fullsteam Records). It was recorded at Nordic Audio Labs and is lyrically themed around the six curses of mankind. Rotten Sound headlined the "Cursed to Tour" from April to May in Germany. The line up for this month-long tour included Trap Them, Gaza, The Kandidate, and Haust. Following this tour, Rotten Sound headed to Japan for the Kabuto Metal Fest. Other acts included Morbid Angel and The Haunted.

Species at War, Abuse to Suffer and Suffer to Abuse (2012-present)
In January 2012, Rotten Sound announced the Grind Over Europe Tour 2012. Set to kick off on 24 February in Barcelona, Spain, the band toured through 16 cities over a three-week period with label-mates Exhumed and powerviolence group Magrudergrind. Rotten Sound were toured in support of the band's sixth studio album "Cursed," issued in early 2011 via Relapse Records.

In November 2012, Rotten Sound signed to Season of Mist to a European deal. The band's next EP Species at War, was recorded at Nordic Audio Labs and was mixed and mastered by drummer Sami Latva at Latva Studios and released on 18 January 2013 on CD, etched vinyl, and digital. Keijo Niinimaa says:

The band released its seventh studio album, Abuse to Suffer, in 2016. The album contains an audio sample excerpt of Noam Chomsky's 2011 speech at the Massachusetts Institute of Technology entitled The New War Against Terror: "Yeah, they’re rotten. Lot of rotten things in the world. We should be — if we’re serious — we should be concerned with what we do. And what we can do. If there’s an elementary moral truism, that’s it."

Members

Current members
Keijo Niinimaa - vocals (1993–present)
Mika Aalto - guitar (1993–present)
Sami Latva – drums (2006–present)
David Kasipovic - bass (2020–present)

Former members
Masa Kovero – bass (1994)
Ville Väisänen – drums (1994)
Kai Hahto – drums (1995–2006)
Juha Ylikoski – guitar (1998–2001)
Pekka Ranta – bass (1997–2000)
Mika Häkki – bass (2000–2003)
Toni Pihlaja – bass (2003–2010)
Kristian Toivainen - bass (2010–2020)

Timeline

Discography

Studio albums
1997 – Under Pressure (Repulse/Revenge)
1999 – Drain (Repulse/S.O.A.)
2002 – Murderworks (Autopsy Stench/Necropolis/Century Media/Relapse)
2005 – Exit (Spinefarm/No Tolerance/Willowtip)
2008 – Cycles (Spinefarm)
2011 – Cursed (Relapse)
2016 – Abuse to Suffer (Season of Mist)

Extended plays
1994 – Sick Bastard (Genet)
1995 – Psychotic Veterinarian (S.O.A.)
1996 – Loosin' Face (Anomie)
2000 – Still Psycho (Necropolis/Merciless)
2006 – Consume to Contaminate (Spinefarm/Power It Up)
2008 – Rotten Sound EP (Spinefarm)
2010 – Napalm (Relapse)
2013 – Species at War (Season of Mist)
2018 – Suffer to Abuse (Season of Mist)

Splits
1997 – Spitted Alive Split with Control Mechanism (I.D.S.)
2001 – 8 Hours of Lobotomy Split with Unholy Grave (M.C.R.)
2003 – Seeds of Hate Split with Mastic Scum (Cudgel Agency)

Singles
2011 – Curses (Fullsteam Records)

Compilations
2003 – From Crust 'Til Grind (Century Media) (Contains tracks from Sick Bastard, Psychotic Veterinarin, Loosin' Face and Still Psycho)

DVDs
2004 – Murderlive (Spinefarm)
2010 – Live at Obscene Extreme 2007 (Relapse)

References

External links 
 
 
 
 
 
 Rotten Sound INTERVIEW

Crust and d-beat groups
Grindcore musical groups
Deathgrind musical groups
Political music groups
Finnish death metal musical groups
Finnish hardcore punk groups
Relapse Records artists
Season of Mist artists
Musical groups established in 1993
Musical quartets